The FIBA Stanković Continental Champions’ Cup, also known as FIBA Borislav Stanković World Cup and FIBA Mini Basketball World Cup, is an international tournament of basketball for men's national teams. It is held annually by the International Basketball Federation (FIBA). The tournament is organized in order to help promote the growth of the sport of basketball in the country of China. The first two editions of the tournament, the 2005 Stanković Cup and the 2006 Stanković Cup, were true World Cup competitions, as they included the champions of the various FIBA regional zones.

History
The original idea for the FIBA Stanković World Cup came from Dr. Carl Men Ky Ching, the then-President of FIBA Asia. The purpose of the competition was to honor Serbian basketball legend Borislav Stanković, the then-FIBA Secretary General Emeritus, for his significant contributions to the world of basketball. Being the only Chinese President of the 28 International Sports Federations, Dr. Ching selected China as the host country for the competition. 

Originally, beginning with the Stanković World Cup's inaugural 2005 edition, the competition provided an opportunity for the senior Chinese men's national basketball team to compete against high level national teams from all around the world, as it featured the continental champions of the various FIBA zone regions. High level national teams continued in the competition for the following 2006 edition and 2007 edition.

However, starting with the 2008 edition of the tournament, some of the national teams began sending youth squad selections to the tournament. While starting with the tournament's 2013 edition, the tournament became a lower level tournament in general, with it often featuring teams comprised primarily of youth players.

Summary

Participation details

References

External links 
  
  

 
Basketball competitions in Asia between national teams
International basketball competitions hosted by China
Recurring sporting events established in 2005
2005 establishments in China
FIBA Stanković Continental Champions' Cup